The Legend of Korra is an American animated television series created by Michael Dante DiMartino and Bryan Konietzko. A sequel to Avatar: The Last Airbender, the series first aired on Nickelodeon in 2012. Like its predecessor, the series is set in a fictional world inspired by Asian and Inuit cultures, and inhabited by people who can manipulate the elements of water, earth, fire or air through an ability called "bending." One person, the "Avatar," has the ability to bend all four elements. Reincarnating in turn among the world's four nations, the Avatar is responsible for maintaining peace, harmony, and balance in the world. Korra, the series' protagonist, is the next incarnation of the Avatar after Aang of Avatar: The Last Airbender. Four seasons with a total of 52 episodes have aired.

Series overview

Episodes

Book One: Air  (2012)

Book Two: Spirits (2013)

Book Three: Change (2014)

Book Four: Balance (2014)

Ratings

DVD and Blu-ray releases

Region 1

References

External links
 
 
 

Legend of Korra
Episodes, List Of The Legend Of Korra
Legend of Korra